Ellen M. Travolta (born October 6, 1939) is an American actress known for playing Louisa Arcola Delvecchio in Happy Days and Joanie Loves Chachi as well as Lillian in Charles in Charge (1987-1990).

Early years
Ellen M. Travolta was born on October 6, 1939, in Englewood, New Jersey to Salvatore ("Sam") Travolta and Helen Cecilia (née Burke) Travolta. Her father was a semi-professional football player before becoming a tire salesman and a partner in a Firestone franchise called Travolta Tires.

Travolta has five younger siblings: Joey, Margaret, Sam, Ann, and Hollywood star John.

Travolta attended Dwight Morrow High School in Englewood, New Jersey and Carnegie Mellon University in Pittsburgh, Pennsylvania.

Career
As an actress and singer, she appeared with "The Sunshine Sisters," a radio vocal group. She later became a drama coach, actress, and director of student productions.

She is probably best known for her portrayal of Louisa Arcola Delvecchio, the aunt of Fonzie (Henry Winkler) and mother of Chachi Arcola (Scott Baio), in five episodes during the 1980s of the 1950s-era American sitcom Happy Days and in episodes of its spin-off Joanie Loves Chachi. Travolta also played the mother of Baio's character on the syndicated comedy series Charles in Charge from 1987 to 1990.

She had already portrayed Jimmy Baio's mother on a 1978 episode of The Love Boat. Travolta played Mrs. Horshack-O'Hara in three episodes of Welcome Back, Kotter, a comedy series on which her brother, actor John Travolta, starred as Vinnie Barbarino. She also appeared alongside her brother in the 1978 summer blockbuster Grease. Later in the 1970s, she played Dorothy Manucci in the short-lived television series Makin' It. She played Marion Keisker in John Carpenter's 1979 television film Elvis.

Personal life
Travolta has been a longtime performer and supporter of the Coeur d'Alene Summer Theatre where she appeared in a production of Hello, Dolly! in the Coeur d'Alene Summer Theatre in 2000 and 2012 playing the star role opposite her husband's portrayal of Horace Vandergelder. The theatre is the beneficiary of the Helen Burke Travolta Memorial fund, established in honor of Travolta's mother. Travolta has stated, "My mother was the beginning of all of this for us. She loved the theater, and she was always involved with the community theater and she encouraged all of us to be in it."

Travolta married James Fridley in May 1964. They had two children, a son, actor Tom Fridley and a daughter, Molly Allen Ritter.

Travolta and Fridley divorced in 1977. She then married actor Jack Bannon on April 9, 1983. In 1994, the couple moved to Coeur d'Alene, Idaho. They remained together until Bannon's death in 2017.

Selected TV and filmography

References

External links

 
 

1940 births
20th-century American actresses
21st-century American actresses
Actresses from New Jersey
American film actresses
American musical theatre actresses
American soap opera actresses
American television actresses
Dwight Morrow High School alumni
Carnegie Mellon University College of Fine Arts alumni
Living people
People from Englewood, New Jersey
Travolta family